The Elevate Festival is an annual festival that takes place around the Schloßberg in Graz, Austria. The aim of the festival is to create a better understanding of the most important issues of our time and to discuss groundbreaking alternatives, innovative projects, and various initiatives in the realm of civil society, social movements and dedicated activism. Elevate combines contemporary music, art and political discourse. The organizational body is a Nonprofit organization. All the discourse and film programme of the festival is free of charge. The performing artists at Elevate usually present an eclectic array of styles, beyond conventions and the mainstream.

History
Starting point for the idea to combine music and political discourse was the Exit-Space event  on local cultural policy making in Graz in 2003. In 2005 the concept was expanded into an international festival around the Schloßberg in Graz. The founders and organizers of the festival - Berhard Steirer, Daniel Erlacher and Roland Oreski - had the idea for the festival's name during a ride in the elevator up to the top of the Schloßberg.

By year
2005
For the first time the Elevate Festival took place in 2005. In this year everything had to do with "Independent People/Independent Movements". In 2005 Jimmy Wales was an invited speaker at the Festival.

2006
In 2006 the topic of the festival was "Elevate the Debate". The discussions mainly dealt with free media, live video streaming and basic income.

2007
The topic of 2007's Elevate Festival was "Elevate Democracy!" In 2007 Cynthia McKinney and Danny Schechter were at the festival in Graz.

2008
In 2008 "Elevate the Commons" was the theme of the festival. Percy Schmeiser was one of the guests.

2009
The festival was dedicated to the topic "Elevate the Crises" with guests such as Amy Goodman, Pat Mooney, Christian Felber, Raimund Löw or Anneliese Rohrer.

2010
The festival featured Mike Bonanno (The Yes Men) and Bill McKibben among others. The main theme was "Elevate the Civil Society".

2011
Johan Galtung, Mark Stevenson, Nafeez Mosaddeq Ahmed looked into the future to explore how to "Elevate the 21st Century".

2012
"Elevate the Apocalypse?": Christian Payne, Jacob Appelbaum, Polly Higgins and others discussed whether we need major catastrophes in order to tackle the challenges of our time.

2013
"Elevate Open Everything?" - guests like Jacob Appelbaum, Birgitta Jónsdóttir, Anne Roth discussed radical openness in technology, innovation, activism, and politics.

2014
To honour the 10th anniversary of the festival the theme "Elevate #10 – Discourse & Activism" invited scientists like John Holloway, computer engineers like Micah Lee and artists such as Antonino D'Ambrosio to draw lessons from the past and look into the future.

2015
"Elevate Creative Response!" - the 11th edition of the festival explored how creative thinking provides avenues to tackle current challenges.

2016
As a result of a European festival cooperation, the theme in 2016 was "We Are Europe" and focused on change processes in Europe. Among the guests were journalist and WikiLeaks activist Sarah Harrison, the philosopher Srećko Horvat, and the French director Hind Meddeb.

2017
The topic the 2017 edition was "Big data, quantification & algorithms - Who will be the decision-makers of the 21st century?".

2018
The role of "Risk/Courage" in the context of societal change will be highlighted during the 2018 festival. With a focus on whistleblowing the controversial WikiLeaks founder Julian Assange will be among the speakers.

2019
The Elevate Festival 2019 explores and debates the concept of "Truth" with guests like animal rights activist Pamela Anderson, poet Nnimmo Bassey, and philosopher Srećko Horvat.

2020

"Human Nature" and the relationship between humans, nature and technological development is the motto of the 2020 Elevate Festival. The philosopher Ariadne von Schirach, the film maker Douglas Rushkoff and the activist Elizabeth Wathuti are among the guests in the discourse program.

Elevate Awards
Between 2012 and 2015 the Elevate Awards were granted to people, organizations, and initiatives which are actively working for social, ecological and/or economical justice. There were three categories: The International Elevate Award, the Elevate Award Steiermark for regional projects in Austria and the Elevate Artivism Award for the threshold between arts and activism.

Elevate Awards 2012

Elevate Award Steiermark: Hofkollektiv Wieserhoisl

International Elevate Award: Réseau des femmes pour le développement durable en Afrique (REFDAF)

Elevate Artivism Award: Susanne Prosegga

Elevate Awards 2013

Elevate Award Steiermark: Open BioLab Graz

International Elevate Award: Refugee Protest Camp Vienna

Elevate Artivism Award: HOAM:ART

Elevate Awards 2014

Elevate Award Steiermark: KAMA Graz

International Elevate Award: Cryptocat

Elevate Artivism Award: Partycipation

Elevate Awards 2015

Elevate Award Steiermark: Allerleihladen

International Elevate Award: White Helmets

Elevate Artivism Award: Manu Luksch

References

External links
 Elevate Festival Website
 Elevate Festival on Facebook

Festivals in Graz
Festivals established in 2005